The Cleveland mayoral election of 1951 saw the reelection of Thomas A. Burke to a fourth consecutive term.

General election

References

Mayoral elections in Cleveland
Cleveland mayoral
Cleveland
November 1951 events in the United States
1950s in Cleveland